The 2002 All-Ireland Intermediate Hurling Championship was the 19th staging of the All-Ireland hurling championship. The championship began on 19 May 2002 and ended on 22 September 2002.

Cork were the defending champions, however, they were defeated in the provincial championship. Galway won the title after defeating Tipperary by 2–15 to 1–10 in a replay of the final.

References

Intermediate
All-Ireland Intermediate Hurling Championship